Konstantin Buga (born 17 June 1985 in Atbasar, Kazakh Soviet Socialist Republic) is a German amateur boxer best known for qualifying for the 2008 Olympics as a middleweight.

Career

Buga came to Germany in 1996 and received a German passport in 2002. He won the German championships at welterweight in 2005 but moved up to middleweight later.

He participated in the 2007 World Amateur Boxing Championships and was one of only two German quarterfinalists that qualified directly for the Olympics.

He upset local hero Shawn Estrada but lost to the surprise runner-up Alfonso Blanco (boxer).

World amateur championships results 
Defeated Tobias Webb (Wales) RSCO 3
Defeated Jean-Mickaël Raymond (France) 19-8
Defeated Shawn Estrada (United States) 11-11
Lost to Alfonso Blanco (Venezuela) 9-18

Olympic games results 
Lost to Carlos Góngora (Ecuador) 7-14

References

External links
World Championships 2007

Kazakhstani emigrants to Germany
German people of Kazakhstani descent
Middleweight boxers
1985 births
Living people
Boxers at the 2008 Summer Olympics
Olympic boxers of Germany
German male boxers